Futral Family Farm is a historic farm complex and national historic district located in Richlands, Onslow County, North Carolina. The main house was built about 1885, and is a one-story saddle-notched log hall-parlor plan dwelling.  It was enlarged about 1906, with the addition of a frame garret, side room, rear shed rooms, and a semi-detached kitchen and dining room to form a coastal plain cottage with an engaged front porch.

It was listed on the National Register of Historic Places in 1989.

References

Log houses in the United States
Farms on the National Register of Historic Places in North Carolina
Historic districts on the National Register of Historic Places in North Carolina
Houses completed in 1885
Buildings and structures in Onslow County, North Carolina
National Register of Historic Places in Onslow County, North Carolina
Log buildings and structures on the National Register of Historic Places in North Carolina